Smoldno is a small settlement in the hills northeast of Poljane nad Škofjo Loko in the Municipality of Gorenja Vas–Poljane in the Upper Carniola region of Slovenia.

References

External links

Smoldno on Geopedia

Populated places in the Municipality of Gorenja vas-Poljane